The 2018 JAG Metals 350 was the 21st stock car race of the 2018 NASCAR Camping World Truck Series, the second race of the Round of 6, and the 20th iteration of the event. The race was held on Friday, November 2, 2018, in Fort Worth, Texas at Texas Motor Speedway, a  permanent tri-oval shaped racetrack. The race took the scheduled 147 laps to complete. At race's end, Justin Haley of GMS Racing would complete a last lap pass on Todd Gilliland, who ran out of fuel on the last lap to advance to the Final 4. The win was Haley's third and to date, final NASCAR Camping World Truck Series win and his third and final win of the season. To fill out the podium, Ben Rhodes of ThorSport Racing and Brett Moffitt of Hattori Racing Enterprises would finish second and third, respectively.

Background 

Texas Motor Speedway is a speedway located in the northernmost portion of the U.S. city of Fort Worth, Texas – the portion located in Denton County, Texas. The track measures 1.5 miles (2.4 km) around and is banked 24 degrees in the turns, and is of the oval design, where the front straightaway juts outward slightly. The track layout is similar to Atlanta Motor Speedway and Charlotte Motor Speedway (formerly Lowe's Motor Speedway). The track is owned by Speedway Motorsports, Inc., the same company that owns Atlanta and Charlotte Motor Speedway, as well as the short-track Bristol Motor Speedway.

Entry list 

*Withdrew.

Practice

First practice 
The first practice session was held on Thursday, November 1, at 3:05 PM CST, and would last for 50 minutes.

Second and final practice 
The second and final practice session, sometimes referred to as Happy Hour, was held on Thursday, November 1, at 5:05 PM CST, and would last for 50 minutes.

Qualifying 
Qualifying was held on Friday, November 2, at 3:10 PM CST. Since Texas Motor Speedway is at least a 1.5 miles (2.4 km) racetrack, the qualifying system was a single car, single lap, two round system where in the first round, everyone would set a time to determine positions 13–32. Then, the fastest 12 qualifiers would move on to the second round to determine positions 1–12.

Two drivers would fail to qualify: Josh Reaume and Reid Wilson.

Full qualifying results

Race results 
Stage 1 Laps: 35

Stage 2 Laps: 35

Stage 3 Laps: 77

References 

2018 NASCAR Camping World Truck Series
NASCAR races at Texas Motor Speedway
November 2018 sports events in the United States
2018 in sports in Texas